Entegrus Powerlines is an electric distributor located in southwestern Ontario, Canada.  The utility provides electrical supply to approximately 40,000 customers.  
Its service territory covers 96 square kilometres of urban areas, encompassed within a 5,000 square kilometre geographic area between Windsor (to the west), London (to the east) and Sarnia (to the north).  
The Entegrus Powerlines service territory is more specifically described as encompassing the following:

Formerly served towns
Those parts of the following former municipalities (including the former Police Village of Merlin) that the former dissolved public utilities served on December 31, 1997
 Town of Blenheim
 Town of Bothwell
 City of Chatham
 Town of Dresden
 Village of Erieau
 Police Village of Merlin
 Town of Ridgetown
 Village of Thamesville
 Town of Tilbury
 Town of Wallaceburg,
 Village of Wheatley, and 
 Part Lots 16 & 17, Concession A, Geographic Township of Raleigh, designated as Part 1, Reference Plan 24R 7195, Municipality of Chatham-Kent, and Part Lot 17, Concession A, Geographic Township of Raleigh, designated as Part 2, Reference Plan 7195, Municipality of Chatham-Kent as per Board Order RP-2003-0044, dated September 16, 2003.
 The former Town of Strathroy as of December 31, 2000.
 The former Police Village of Mount Brydges as of December 31, 2000.
 The former Town of Parkhill as of December 31, 2000.
 The Village of Dutton as of December 31, 1997, now within the Municipality of Dutton/Dunwich.
 The Village of Newbury as of November 7, 1998.

Companies based in Ontario
Electric cooperatives
Cooperatives in Canada